Mother Didn't Tell Me is a 1950 American comedy film written and directed by Claude Binyon. It is based on the 1949 book The Doctor Wears Three Faces by Mary Bard.  The film stars Dorothy McGuire, William Lundigan, June Havoc, Gary Merrill, Jessie Royce Landis and Joyce MacKenzie. The film was released on March 3, 1950, by 20th Century Fox.

Plot
Advertising jingle writer Jane Morgan is treated for a cold by a doctor, Bill Wright, and soon they date and fall in love. Jane is warned by Bill's mother and by another doctor's wife, Maggie, about the complications of being married to someone in that profession, work always taking priority over his personal life.

Jane gives birth to twins, but her gradual frustration over Bill's absences are further irritated by his intended collaboration with physician Helen Porter, who is very attractive and makes Jane jealous. When she pretends to be ill simply to coax Bill into coming home, Jane is annoyed when Helen turns up to treat her instead, causing friction between the two women.

Just as Jane is packed and preparing to leave her husband, the couple's children are accidentally poisoned. Bill is able to save them. A grateful Jane also learns that Mrs. Wright has persuaded Helen to take a job in another city.

Cast
Dorothy McGuire as Jane Morgan
William Lundigan as Doctor William Wright
June Havoc as Maggie Roberts
Gary Merrill as Doctor Peter Roberts
Jessie Royce Landis as Mrs. Wright
Joyce MacKenzie as Helen Porter
Leif Erickson as Dr. Bruce Gordon

References

External links
 
 
 
 

1950 films
20th Century Fox films
American comedy films
1950 comedy films
Films directed by Claude Binyon
Films scored by Cyril J. Mockridge
American black-and-white films
1950s English-language films
1950s American films